Qué Pasa is an album by the Argentine musician Gato Barbieri, released in 1997. It was his first studio album in more than a decade. Barbieri supported it with a North American tour. The album was a hit on Billboards Contemporary Jazz Album chart.

Production
The album was produced by Philippe Saisse. Barbieri and Saisse opted for more of a smooth jazz sound, and also incorporated synthesizers and programmed drums. "The Woman I Remember" is a tribute to Barbieri's late wife. "Blue Gala" is dedicated to the physical therapist who aided Barbieri after his 1995 heart surgery. "Mystica" is an interpretation of Erik Satie's Gymnopédies. Barbieri regretted that the album was around an hour in running time, which he thought was too long.

Critical reception

The Record deemed the album "a softer blend of Latin hip-hop," writing that "it often is overloaded with the unnatural, plasticized sounds brought on by programming and overdubbing." Hispanic noted that "Barbieri's one-of-a-kind muscular tone is sensual and exotic, with a universal appeal that makes his music timeless pop." The Jerusalem Post concluded that, "having traveled, over the course of three decades, from primeval, screaming wildness to soft, minimal whispers, Barbieri now steers an elegant, knowing, and sensuous middle course."

AllMusic wrote that Barbieri "does little other than state the 11 melodies (which range from catchy to completely forgettable), and the backing is quite anonymous, over-produced and obviously geared for potential radio airplay." MusicHound Jazz: The Essential Album Guide gave the album a rare zero-star rating (woof!').

Track listing

References

Gato Barbieri albums
1997 albums
Columbia Records albums